Magistrates' Courts Act (with its variations) is a stock short title used for legislation in the United Kingdom relating to magistrates' courts.

The Bill for an Act with this short title may have been known as a Magistrates' Courts Bill during its passage through Parliament.

Magistrates' Courts Acts may be a generic name either for legislation bearing that short title or for all legislation which relates to magistrates courts.

List

United Kingdom

The Magistrates' Courts Act 1952 (15 & 16 Geo.6 & 1 Eliz.2 c.55)
The Magistrates' Courts Act 1957 (5 & 6 Eliz.2 c.29)
The Magistrates' Courts (Appeals From Binding Over Orders) Act 1956 (4 & 5 Eliz.2 c.44)
The Metropolitan Magistrates' Courts Act 1959 (7 & 8 Eliz.2 c.45)
The Domestic Proceedings and Magistrates' Courts Act 1978 (c.22)  
The Magistrates' Courts Act 1980 (c.43)
The Police and Magistrates' Courts Act 1994 (c.29)
The Magistrates' Courts (Procedure) Act 1998 (c.15)

Northern Ireland

The Magistrates' Courts Act (Northern Ireland) 1964 (N.I.) (c.21)

Magistrates' Courts Order

An Order in Council with this title has been passed. The change in nomenclature is due to the demise of the Parliament of Northern Ireland and the imposition of direct rule. This order is considered to be primary legislation.

The Magistrates' Courts (Northern Ireland) Order 1981 (S.I. 1981/1675 (N.I.26))

See also
List of short titles

Lists of legislation by short title
Law of the United Kingdom